Hovhannes Arutyunovich Zanazanyan (10 December 1946 – 4 October 2015) was a Soviet football player and an Armenian coach.

Honours
 Soviet Top League winner: 1973.
 Soviet Cup winner: 1973, 1975.
 Olympic bronze: 1972.

International career
Zanazanyan made his debut for USSR on 28 August 1972 in the Olympics game against Burma.

External links
 Profile 
 Profile at KLISF
 
 

1946 births
2015 deaths
Footballers from Athens
Greek footballers
Greek people of Armenian descent
Soviet Armenians
Soviet footballers
Soviet Union international footballers
Armenian footballers
Armenian football managers
Soviet Top League players
FC Ararat Yerevan players
FC Spartak Moscow players
FC Urartu managers
Olympic footballers of the Soviet Union
Footballers at the 1972 Summer Olympics
Olympic bronze medalists for the Soviet Union
Olympic medalists in football
Greek emigrants to the Soviet Union
FC Spartak Yerevan managers
Association football midfielders
Medalists at the 1972 Summer Olympics